Larry Marshall may refer to:

Larry Marshall (singer) (1941–2017), Jamaican reggae musician
Larry Marshall (actor) (born 1944), American actor and singer
Larry Marshall (American football) (born 1950), American football player
Larry R. Marshall, Australian venture capitalist, physicist and CEO of Commonwealth Scientific and Industrial Research Organisation (CSIRO)